Twenty is the fifteenth studio album by American R&B group Boyz II Men. The album was released in the United States on October 25, 2011.  The first single was "More Than You'll Ever Know" featuring Charlie Wilson. As of September 2011, the single was the most added song to radio sets on urban adult contemporary radio stations. The album featured 13 new material songs and nine rerecorded Boyz II Men classics. It was produced Tim & Bob, Babyface, Jimmy Jam and Terry Lewis, and Teddy Riley. The album debuted at number 20 on the Billboard 200, selling 18,400 copies in its first week.

Critical reception 

AllMusic editor Andy Kellman called the album Boyz II Men's "most enjoyable work since 2000's Nathan Michael Shawn Wanya." He found that "rather than attempt to compete with younger acts on the charts, they largely stick to their tried and true approach and appeal to their longtime listeners. Some of the slower songs get a little raunchy, but most of them switch between romantic pleading and uplifting/inspirational modes [...] That Boyz II Men still have it, both individually and collectively, is undeniable; their group harmonies sound as easy as ever. That’s what they had over most contemporary R&B acts in 1991, and that's what they have over all of them in 2011."

Chart performance
Twenty debuted at number 20 on the US Billboard 200, selling 18,400 copies in its first week of release.

Track listing

Charts

Weekly charts

Year-end charts

Release history

References 

2011 albums
Boyz II Men albums
Albums produced by Babyface (musician)
Albums produced by Da Internz
Albums produced by Jimmy Jam and Terry Lewis
Albums produced by Tim & Bob
Albums produced by Wanya Morris
Avex Group albums